Grigory Aleksandrovich Antipenko (born October 10, 1974, Moscow, RSFSR, USSR) is a  Russian film and theater actor.

Biography 
Born October 10, 1974 in a family of engineers in Moscow. 

As a child he lived at Mosfilmovskaya Street and opposite the studio, where his mother worked as a process engineer. From an early age fascinated by biology, since 8 years he studied encyclopedias, memorizing the names of animals in Latin, and dreamed of traveling. Reptiles, especially snakes - most favorite fauna.

From his youth he studied at drama school, but in a higher Boris Shchukin Theatre Institute did only 22 years old. Prior to that, he graduated from pharmaceutical school and worked as a fitter in the scene  Satiricon Theatre. 

In 2003 he graduated from the Boris Shchukin Theatre Institute (course of Rodion Ovchinnikov).

In 2003-2004 he worked in the theater  Et cetera. In 2011 he was invited to the Vakhtangov Theatre directed by Mikhail Tsitrinyak  Medea.

In September 2013, he joined the troupe Vakhtangov Theatre.

Selected filmography
 Code of Honor (2002) as episode
 Not Born Beautiful (2005 – 2006) as Andrey  Zhdanov
 Shakespeare Never Dreamed (2006) as Stepanov / Rogue / Bell
  Waiting for a Miracle (2007) as passenger on the plane
 Angels Cried that Night (2008) as Ivan Nikitin
 Moscow, I Love You! (2007) as Sergey Aleksandrovich
A Mother's Heart (2010)
Chyornaya metka (2011)
Pulya-dura 4: Agent i sokrovishche natsii (2011)
Vozmezdie (2011)
Pulya-dura 5: Izumrudnoe delo agenta (2011)
Spasti muzha (2011)
Vozvrashchenie v 'A' ( 2011)
Vesna v dekabre (2011)
Vasilki dlya Vasilisy (2012)
Veryu (2012)
Otdam zhenu v khoroshie ruki (2012)
Balzakovskiy vozrast, ili Vse muzhiki svo... 5 let spustya (2013)
45 sekund (2013)
Podporuchik Romashov (2013)
Torgsin ( 2017) as Viktor Serebrov
Знахарь (2019)

Awards
2006 —  The People's Prize  TV Star  (Ukraine) in the category  Best TV Actor of the Year 
2008 — Best Actor at the festival  Love Man  named after Sergei Gerasimov

Private Life 
Grigory Antipenko's first wife Elena Antipenko, with whom he has a son - Alexander (December 16, 1999). From 2006 till 2012 he was in civil partnership with actress Yulia Takshina (born July 9, 1980), whom he met on the set of the television series Not Born Beautiful. After six years of relationship, the couple broke up. They have two sons - Ivan (June 27, 2007) and Fedor (July 3, 2009). In 2019, the actor announced that he entered into an official marriage for the second time and his 4th son Athanasius (July 3, 2019) was born. The name of the new wife is kept secret.

References

External links
 
Official website
 Театр Современной Антрепризы. Григорий Антипенко

1974 births
Living people
Russian male film actors
Russian male stage actors
Russian male television actors
Male actors from Moscow
21st-century Russian male actors